Kawa no kami is a river deity in Japanese mythology. He is also king of the river gods. 

The lineage of this kami is not mentioned in classical text. However, the Man'yōshū includes poems indicating that Kawa no kami serves the emperor. Kawa no kami is mentioned in the Nihon Shoki and is it said that kappa are a representation of him.

Name 
The god typically goes by Kawa no kami but he also goes by Kahaku. His name is considered a generic name for kami of rivers or streams.

Worship 
Many sources show that people offered human sacrifice to Kawa no kami. Back in the day when rivers were in flood, people would perform human sacrifice to please Kawa no kami. However, with the introduction of Buddhism this practice ended. Leading to people using dolls made of flower or straw instead as offerings to Kawa no kami. This is still practiced today in some parts of Japan.

In popular culture 

Kawa no kami is a minor character in the 2001 animated movie Spirited Away. There is a scene where Kawa no kami goes to the bath house. The god is full of so much trash giving the appearance of a stink spirit leading the staff to be hesitant to clean him. When Chiriro is  tasked to clean Kawa no Kami she discovers something sticking out from the side of Kawa no kami so she decides to pull it out. The other staff then assist Chiriro then they realize he wasn’t a stink spirit after all but a river spirit corrupted by pollution. Many have argued the scene in particular represents themes about environmental issues.

References 

Shinto
Japanese gods
Shinto in popular culture
Sea and river gods